Comme un coup de tonnerre ("Like A Thunderclap") is a French documentary about socialist candidate Lionel Jospin's campaign of 2002 for president and his subsequent ousting from the second election turn by Jean-Marie Le Pen. It was directed by Stéphane Meunier.

Similar works
À Hauteur d'homme: Documentary about Bernard Landry's re-election campaign of 2003 in Quebec, Canada.
The War Room: American documentary about Bill Clinton's primary campaign and first presidential election of 1992.
Street Fight: An Academy Award-nominated documentary about Cory Booker's ultimately unsuccessful 2002 run against Sharpe James for mayor of Newark, New Jersey, United States by filmmaker Marshall Curry.

See also
Lionel Jospin
2002 French presidential election

External links

French documentary films
2002 television films
2002 films
2002 documentary films
2000s French-language films
Documentary films about elections
Politics of France
2000s French films